Velupillai Suppiah Thurairajah (8 August 1927 – 14 December 2011) was a Sri Lankan Tamil architect who designed many buildings in Sri Lanka and abroad.

Early life and family
Thurairajah was born on 8 August 1927. He was the son of Vellupillai Suppiah and Thangacchimuttu from Navaly in northern Ceylon. He was educated at Green Memorial School, Manipay and Manipay Hindu College. After school Thurairajah joined the Sir J. J. School of Art in Bombay in 1948, graduating in 1951 with a diploma in architecture.

Thurairajah married Selvaranee (Rani), daughter of T. Thirunavukarasu. They had a son (Surendran) and three daughters (Vathsala, Manjula and Sashikala).

Career
After returning to Ceylon Thurairajah joined the Public Works Department (PWD) in 1951 as a junior architect. He then joined the Architectural Association School of Architecture in London in 1954 as a Colombo Plan scholar, graduating in 1957 with a A.A. diploma specialising in tropical architecture. He then resumed his career at the PWD before retiring in 1964 in due to government policies.

After retirement Thurairajah started a private practice known as Thurairajah Associates in 1964. The practice grew and in 1968 a branch office was opened in Jaffna. Thurairajah designed many of the tropical modernist buildings in Jaffna. During a long career Thurairajah designed numerous buildings including factories, Hindu temples, hospitals, hotels, office buildings, residential buildings and university buildings in Sri Lanka, India, Australia and Middle East.

Thurairajah was a fellow of the Royal Institute of British Architects (1967), Australian Institute of Architects (1989), Indian Institute of Architects (1965), Sri Lanka Institute of Architects (1976) and Chartered Institute of Arbitrators (1968). He was editor and publisher of a quarterly journal called Architecture and Arts in Sri Lanka from 1975 to 1981. He was chairman of Eelanadu, a Tamil language newspaper, in 1975 and one of the secretaries of the International Association of Tamil Research. Thurairajah was one of the key organisers of the 4th International Tamil Research Conference held in Jaffna in 1974. He was deputy district governor of the Lions International Sri Lanka District in 1981 and secretary of the Ananda Coomaraswamy Cultural Society. Thurairajah produced the Tamil language film Kuthu Vilakku (Sacred Lamp) in 1972.

Thurairajah migrated to Australia. He died on 14 December 2011 in Sydney, Australia.

Works
Thurairajah's numerous work include:

Banks
 Bank of Ceylon, Hambantota
 Bank of Ceylon, Moratuwa
 Bank of Ceylon, Vavuniya
 Co-operative Bank, Jaffna
 Co-operative Bank, Mannar (1978)
 Co-operative Bank, Paranthan

Factories
 Ajantha Textile Factory, Ratmalana
 Baxon Textile Factory, Ratmalana
 Busalwatha Pharmaceutical Factory, Busalwatha
 Ceylon Synthetic Mills, Colombo
 Ceylon Tin Factory, Colombo
 Favourites Textile Factory, Ratmalana (1972)
 Modern Confectionery Works, Colombo
 Nagindas Textile Factory, Ratmalana
 Paragons Textile Factory, Ratmalana
 St. Anthony's PVC Factory, Colombo
 Uswatha Confectionery Factory, Ratmalana
 Visaka Textile Factory, Ratmalana

Hindu temples

 Galle Hindu Temple, Galle (gopuram)
 New Kathiresan Temple, Colombo (1982)
 Old Kathiresan Temple, Colombo
 Perth Sivan Temple, Perth, Australia.
 Ramboda Hanuman Temple, Ramboda
 Sri Ponnambalavaneswarar Temple, Colombo (gopuram)
 Sydney Murugan Temple, Sydney, Australia (1998)

Hospitals
 Gampaha Base Hospital, Gampaha (2001)
 Kandy General Hospital, Kandy (cardiothoracic building) (2000)
 Kandy General Hospital, Kandy (surgical building)
 National Hospital of Sri Lanka, Colombo (cardiology building) (1997)
 Negombo Base Hospital, Negombo (2001)
 Tissamaharama Hospital, Tissamaharama

Hotels
 Brighton Hotel, Colombo
 Hindu Pilgrims' Rest, Kataragama
 Holiday Inn, Colombo (1980)
 Hotel Amali Nivas, Polonnaruwa
 Sapphire Hotel, Colombo (1968)
 Subhas Hotel, Jaffna

Office buildings
 All Ceylon Hindu Congress Building, Colombo (1982)
 Batticaloa DIG's Office, Batticaloa (1980)
 Ceylon Printers Building, Colombo
 Eye Donation Society Headquarters, Colombo (1983)
 Government Clerical Services Union Building, Colombo (1966)
 Jaffna DIG's Office, Jaffna
 Matara Merchants Building, Matara
 Naleem's Building, Colombo
 Northern Division Cooperative Federation Building, Jaffna

Residential buildings
 Batticaloa Housing Scheme, Batticaloa
 Dubai Housing Scheme, Dubai, United Arab Emirates
 Kubrah, Colombo
 Leedons Apartments, Colombo (1980)
 Nugegoda Housing Development, Nugegoda
 Siffani Flats, Colombo
 VST Buildings, Colombo (1969)

University buildings
 Ramanathan Academy of Fine Arts, Maruthanarmadam
 University of Colombo, Colombo (administration building)
 University of Jaffna, Jaffna (mathematics and computer science building)
 University of Jaffna, Jaffna (faculty of medicine)
 University of Jaffna, Jaffna (faculty of science)

Others

 Anti-malaria Campaign Building, Narahenpita (2000)
 Army Buddhist Temple, Panagoda
 Batticaloa Market, Batticaloa
 CMS Girls College, Jaffna
 Duraiappah Stadium, Jaffna
 Farm, Mankulam
 Girls' Hostel, Colombo
 Jaffna Market, Jaffna
 Jaffna Public Library, Jaffna (second stage) (2001) 
 Kathiresan Hall, Colombo
 Luxmi Cinema, Ratnapura
 Nava Cinema, Colombo
 Navalar Cultural Hall, Jaffna
 Ramakrishna Mission Library, Colombo (1985)
 Rio Cinema, Colombo
 S. J. V. Chelvanayakam memorial, Jaffna (1982)
 Vaddukoddai Technical College, Vaddukoddai
 Veerasingam Hall, Jaffna
 Vipulanandar School of Music and Dance, Batticaloa 
 Vivekananda Hall, Colombo

References

1927 births
2011 deaths
Alumni of the Architectural Association School of Architecture
Alumni of Manipay Hindu College
Australian people of Sri Lankan Tamil descent
Fellows of the Royal Institute of British Architects
People from British Ceylon
People from Jaffna District
Sir Jamsetjee Jeejebhoy School of Art alumni
Sri Lankan Tamil architects
Sri Lankan Tamil film producers
20th-century Sri Lankan architects
21st-century Sri Lankan architects